The California Club is an invitation-only private club established in 1888, based in Los Angeles, California. 

According to the Los Angeles Times, "The people who run Los Angeles belong to the Jonathan Club; the people who own Los Angeles belong to the California Club."  The California Club maintains a mandatory requirement that all new members wishing to gain entry must receive invitations from no less than six existing club members, pass a series of interviews by the club's membership committee and undergo additional background and reference checks in order to obtain admission.

The club ranks number 13 in the "Centrality Rankings" by UC Santa Cruz sociologist G. William Domhoff in his research about social clubs, policy-planning groups, corporations, and ruling-class cohesiveness.

Organizational history 
The California Club was incorporated on December 24, 1888. The first organizational meeting was held September 24, 1887, with N. C. Coleman as chairman and H. T. DeWilson as secretary.

The constitution and bylaws of the Union Social Club, of San Francisco, was reported and accepted without any change by the body of gentlemen assembled. There was considerable discussion on the ... name of the club, and ... it was decided to call it the California Club, of Los Angeles. The section in the bylaws granting army and navy officers all the privileges of members upon half-rate caused considerable feeling among the members. Four votes were taken on the question, and at last it was decided to allow the bylaws to read as they have for twenty-five years in the Union Club.

The club's first location was in the second-floor rooms over the Tally-Ho Stables on the northwest corner of First and Fort (Broadway) streets, where the Los Angeles County Law Library now stands.  It moved to the Wilcox Building on the southeast corner of Second and Spring streets in 1895, occupying the two top floors, the fourth and fifth.  The building was the first in Los Angeles to have two elevators—one for the public and the other for members.  The men's dining room, reading room, bar and lounge were on the top floor.  On the floor below was the ladies' dining room.

The club stayed in the Wilcox Building for a decade before moving because of its growing membership. The new location was decided based on the fact that the city was expanding southward and westward. In 1904, the club's headquarters moved to a five-story building with basement and roof garden amenities on Fifth and Hill streets. 

At various times in its history, the California Club was accused of discrimination against women, African Americans, Jews, and other minorities. In a vote taken in June 1987, 90 percent of the voting members favored admitting women. In addition, the Los Angeles City Council in May 1987 voted 12-0 to ban discriminatory practices at institutions in Los Angeles like the California Club. Since that time, the Club has maintained a non-discriminatory policy for admission to membership.

The current clubhouse
The current seven-story clubhouse was completed on August 25, 1930, after construction was started in late 1928. The building was designed by Robert D. Farquhar, an architect trained at the École des Beaux-Arts in Paris.  The American Institute of Architects awarded Farquhar its Distinguished Honor Award for the design of the California Club building.

According to the National Park Service:

The structure is considered one of the most important buildings of the architect Robert D. Farquhar. Built in 1930, The Italian Renaissance Revival style building, with its setbacks and tower, was among the largest buildings in the immediate area when the site was chosen. Elements like the private forecourt, which partially shields the front entrance and first floor, provides the club with a sense of privacy and understated design.

The building was listed on the U.S. National Register of Historic Places on July 6, 2010. The listing was featured in the National Park Service's weekly list of July 16, 2010.

In addition to antiques and handcrafted furniture, the clubhouse is decorated with a collection of Western-themed, plein air paintings by such American landscape painters as J. Bond Francisco, Elmer Wachtel, Franz A. Bischoff, George Kennedy Brandriff, William Wendt and Paul Lauritz.

See also
 List of American gentlemen's clubs
 Membership discrimination in California social clubs

Notes

References
 Maynard McFie, The History of the California Club.

External links

 The California Club website

Buildings and structures in Downtown Los Angeles
Clubs and societies in California
Culture of Los Angeles
Organizations based in Los Angeles
Gentlemen's clubs in California
Los Angeles Historic-Cultural Monuments
Clubhouses on the National Register of Historic Places in Los Angeles
Organizations established in 1887
1887 establishments in California
19th century in Los Angeles
Buildings and structures completed in 1930
1930 establishments in California
1930s architecture in the United States
Italian Renaissance Revival architecture in the United States
Renaissance Revival architecture in California